The Solomon Islands women's national football team represents Solomon Islands in international women's association football. The team is controlled by the Solomon Islands Football Federation (SIFF) and is affiliated to the Oceania Football Confederation (OFC). Their current head coach is the former footballer Timothy Inifiri.

Despite having not yet qualified for a FIFA Women's World Cup, the Solomon Islands finished fourth in the OFC Women's Nations Cup twice, in 2007 and 2010, and third in the 2022 OFC Women's Nations Cup. The team is one of the youngest national teams in Oceania, having played its first match in April 2007.

History
Solomon Islands disputed its first game on 9 April 2007, for the eight OFC Women's Nations Cup, celebrated in their neighbour country Papua New Guinea. Their first rival was the host team, against whom the team lost 6–1. Prudence Fula became the Solomon Islands' first scorer ever. The nation finished last in the four-team tournament, after a heavy loss with New Zealand and a goalless tie against Tonga. Noel Wagapu coached the team, which consisted of former players of the under-17, under-19 and under-20 national teams.

With Timothy Infiri as the team's manager, the Solomon Islands did an average performance at the 2007 South Pacific Games football tournament in Apia, Samoa. There, the national team managed to achieve its first victory, 3–0 facing American Samoa. Unfortunately, they couldn't advance to the semi-finals due to two losses; with Fiji and Papua New Guinea.

Solomon Islands returned in the 2010 OFC Women's Championship, celebrated in New Zealand. The team was drawn in Group B, along with Papua New Guinea, Tonga and Fiji. The Solomon Islands qualified for the semi-finals after winning to Tonga and tying with Fiji. The team was beaten by the Football Ferns of New Zealand 8–0 in the semi-finals and 2–0 by the Cook Islands in the third-place match.

The team failed to past the group stage in the 2011 Pacific Games tournament. Solomon Islands only won over American Samoa 4–0 and lost the other three games. However, they managed to achieve their best result against Papua New Guinea, a narrow 1–0 loss.

The national team's most recent appearance was in the 2015 Pacific Games, after not entering the 2014 OFC Women's Nations Cup. Solomon Islands was defeated in all of its three matches.

Results and fixtures

Legend

The following is a list of match results in the last 12 months, as well as any future matches that have been scheduled.

2022

2023

Head-to-head record

Players

Current squad
The following players were called up for the 2022 OFC Women's Nations Cup from 13 to 30 July in Suva, Fiji.

Caps and goals updated as of 12 July 2022, before the game against Fiji.

2019 squad
The following players were called up for the 2019 Pacific Games from 7–20 July in Apia, Samoa.

Caps and goals updated as of 15 July 2019, after the game against the Cook Islands.

Recent call-ups
The following players have been called up for the team in the last 12 months.

Records

Top goalscorers

Competitive record

FIFA Women's World Cup

Olympic Games

OFC Women's Nations Cup

Pacific Games

Pacific Mini Games

See also

Sport in Solomon Islands
Football in Solomon Islands
Women's football in Solomon Islands
Solomon Islands men's national football team

References

Oceanian women's national association football teams
women